Dębicki (feminine: Dębicka, plural Dębiccy) or Debicki is a Polish-language surname derived from place names such as Dębica and Dębica County. It may refer to:
 Edward Dębicki (born 1935), Polish-Ukrainian Romani poet and musician
 Elizabeth Debicki (born 1990), Australian actress
 Stanisław Dębicki (1866–1924), Polish painter
 Tadeusz Dębicki (born 1945), Polish politician
Khaled Debiki (born 1983), Egyptian Engineer

See also
 

Polish-language surnames